Ari Magalhães (11 October 1928 in Oeiras, Piauí – 15 June 2021 in São Paulo) was a Brazilian politician.

Biography 
From 1995 until 1999, he served as a member of the Chamber of Deputies.

Magalhães died of respiratory complications from COVID-19 at the age of 81 in São Paulo.

References

1928 births
2021 deaths
Members of the Chamber of Deputies (Brazil) from Piauí
Deaths from the COVID-19 pandemic in São Paulo (state)